Aphelocheirus is a genus of true bugs belonging to the family Aphelocheiridae.

The genus was first described by Westwood in 1833.

The genus has almost cosmopolitan distribution.

Species:
 Aphelocheirus aestivalis (Fabricius, 1794)

References

Hemiptera
Hemiptera genera